Shelton and Hardwick is a civil parish in South Norfolk, England, made up of the villages of Shelton and Hardwick. It lies about 3 km south-east of Long Stratton, about 6 km north of Harleston and 10 km west of Bungay.

Shelton contains a primary school, a church and Shelton Hall.

Churches
Hardwick has a grade I listed church (which is famous locally for its ruined tower  and is one of 124 existing round-tower churches in Norfolk), as well as several farms and a substantial amount of housing. It was also home to a Royal Air Force airfield, which was used by the United States Army Air Forces during World War II.

St Mary's Church, Shelton, was built in the 1480s of red brick with dark diapering. Apart from the tower which is earlier than the rest of the church it is in the pure Perpendicular style. The stained class windows include large figures of donors in 15th-century dress. Features of interest include the monument of Sir Robert Houghton, 1623, and the carved royal arms of King William III. There are also tombs of the Shelton family of Shelton Hall. The church is Grade I listed.

People
The Primitive Methodist preacher Elizabeth Bultitude was born into poverty in Hardwick in 1809.

Notes

External links

St Margaret's on the European Roundtowerchurches Website
Shelton St Mary; norfolk.churches.co.uk
 The 93rd Bombardment Group Museum, Station 104, Hardwick.  A small museum on the actual airfield site in Nissen (Quonset) and brick built huts.

Civil parishes in Norfolk